Gerry Bohanon (born November 26, 1999) is an American football quarterback for the South Florida Bulls. He previously played for the Baylor Bears.

High school career
Bohanon attended Earle High School in Earle, Arkansas. As a senior in 2017, he passed for 2,675 yards and 34 touchdowns, along with an additional 1,200 rushing yards and 17 rushing touchdowns. In 2017, he was named to the Elite 11 finals. A four-star recruit, Bohanon committed to play college football at Baylor University.

College career
Bohanon served as a backup quarterback in his true freshman, redshirt freshman, and sophomore seasons, primarily to Charlie Brewer. Bohanon became the starting quarterback for the 2021 season, his junior season, leading the Bears to an 9–2 start, including three ranked wins, before a hamstring injury in November kept him out of the team's remaining games for the season. In his first six games, he threw zero interceptions. He led the Bears to a 21–7 Sugar Bowl win over Ole Miss. As starter, Bohanon led Baylor to 12–2 record, the most wins in a single season in the school's history. The Bears finished the season in the Top-10 in the AP Poll. 

On May 8, 2022, he announced his transfer to USF.

College statistics

References

External links
Baylor Bears bio

1999 births
Living people
American football quarterbacks
Baylor Bears football players
Players of American football from Arkansas
South Florida Bulls football players